Phon Thong is a district (amphoe) in the northern part of Roi Et province, Thailand.

Geography
Neighboring districts are (from the east clockwise): Moei Wadi, Nong Phok, Selaphum, Pho Chai of Roi Et Province, and Kuchinarai of Kalasin province. The area is famous for the Laem Phayom State Park and the Wat Pa Anantaram place of worship.

History
The district was created on 23 November 1919, consisting of two tambons from Selaphum District, two from Kamalasai and two from Kuchinarai. Another tambon was taken from Din Daeng District, which was abolished on the same day. The other six tambons from Din Daeng were assigned to Saeng Badan District (now a subdistrict in Somdet district).

In 1939 the district, as well as the main tambon, were renamed Waeng. The district name was changed back to Phon Thong in 1953.

Administration
The district is divided into 14 sub-districts (tambons), which are further subdivided into 190 villages (mubans). Phon Thong is a sub-district municipality (thesaban tambon) which covers parts of tambons Waeng and Sa Nokkaeo. There are a further 14 tambon administrative organizations (TAO).

References

External links
amphoe.com

Phon Thong